Aura is a concept album by Miles Davis, produced by Danish composer/trumpeter Palle Mikkelborg, released in 1989. All compositions and arrangements are by Mikkelborg, who created the suite in tribute when Davis received the Léonie Sonning Music Prize in December 1984, the year Decoy was released. This was Miles Davis' final album released in his lifetime.

Background 
The main theme consists of 10 notes, yielded by the letters "M-I-L-E-S-D-A-V-I-S" (see BACH motif, and Schoenberg hexachord "EsCHBEG", and the chart at Musical notes#Accidentals). It is introduced at the beginning over a sustained chord of these same notes. The following 9 movements of the suite represent the colours Mikkelborg sees in Davis's aura.

The music is scored for an extended jazz big band, and the core of the band is formed by the Danish Radio Big Band, featuring Niels-Henning Ørsted Pedersen, Thomas Clausen and Marilyn Mazur. Guests such as John McLaughlin and Davis' nephew Vince Wilburn are featured. The sessions took place in Copenhagen in 1985 at Davis' own initiative, as he had been very honored and satisfied with the suite. It was the first time Miles Davis had recorded with a big band for over 20 years. Aura, however, is not a conventional big band jazz album. The music is perhaps best categorized as fusion jazz with a strong flavor of modern classical music, as many of the orchestral passages reveal Mikkelborg's inspiration from composers like Olivier Messiaen and Charles Ives.

Although the album was recorded at Easy Sound Studios in Copenhagen in 1985, contractual issues delayed its release until 1989. Davis claimed in September 1985 that Columbia would not release it and gave this as a reason for switching labels and signing to Warners, while Columbia itself said the problem was connected with Mikkelborg's own contracts. The album won a Grammy Award in 1990 for Best Jazz Instrumental Performance.

Critical reception 

Aura was well received by music critics. AllMusic editor Thom Jurek described its music as "an amalgam of classical impressionism, European new music, jazz, rock, electronic, and other genres." He called the album Mikkelborg's "fine parting gift" for Davis and wrote, "As a tribute and separate orchestral work, it's quite moving and beautiful, full of moody interludes and evocations of nuance, color, texture, and dynamic. With Davis added, soloing in his trademark muted, rounded warmth, the music becomes almost breathtaking." Wes Long of PopMatters called Aura "ruthlessly inventive", an "ever-moody masterpiece", and "quite possibly the last monumental effort" from Davis. Fred Kaplan of New York commented that the release emerged from an era of "mechanical rut" for Davis and called Aura "a jolting synthesis of jazz, rock, and Messiaen-influenced classical music that lit up a future path lamentably unfollowed."

Todd S. Jenkins of All About Jazz commented that the album "successfully blends Miles’ electric style with the feel of his earlier big-band works with Gil Evans, another of Mikkelborg’s prime inspirations." He wrote in conclusion, "Mikkelborg’s work offered Miles the chance to touch once more upon many of the phases his career had touched and then sailed past. If any post-Bitches Brew album by Miles should be considered essential, this is the one. Pure magic from beginning to end." In Christgau's Record Guide: The '80s (1990), music critic Robert Christgau cited it as Davis' best release during the 1980s. In (The New) Rolling Stone Album Guide (2004), music journalist Paul Evans called Aura "an adventurous and pointedly non-pop-oriented big-band suite".

Track listing 
All tracks composed and arranged by Palle Mikkelborg

 "Intro" – 4:48
 "White" – 6:07
 "Yellow" – 6:55
 "Orange" – 8:41
 "Red" – 6:05
 "Green" – 8:13
 "Blue" – 6:36
 "Electric Red" – 4:19
 "Indigo" – 6:06
 "Violet" – 9:04

Personnel 
 Trumpet: Miles Davis
 Trumpets and flugelhorns: Benny Rosenfeld, Idrees Sulieman, Jens Winther, Palle Bolvig, Perry Knudsen, Palle Mikkelborg
 Trombones: Jens Engel, Ture Larsen, Vincent Nilsson
 Bass trombone: Ole Kurt Jensen
 Bass trombone, tuba: Axel Windfeld
 Saxophones and woodwinds: Bent Jædig, Flemming Madsen, Jesper Thilo, Per Carsten, Uffe Karskov
 Oboe and English horn: Niels Eje
 Keyboards: Kenneth Knudsen, Ole Kock Hansen, Thomas Clausen
 Guitars: Bjarne Roupé, John McLaughlin
 Bass: Niels-Henning Ørsted Pedersen
 Fender bass and fretless bass: Bo Stief
 Drums: Lennart Gruvstedt
 Electronic drums: Vincent Wilburn Jr.
 Percussion: Ethan Weisgaard, Marilyn Mazur
 Harp: Lillian Thornquist
 Vocals: Eva Hess-Thaysen

Production 
 Producer: Palle Mikkelborg
 Engineers: Henrik Lund, Niels Erik Land
 Art Direction: Stacy Drummond
 Photography: Gilles Larrain

Notes

References

External links 
 ? (2011). "Miles Davis: Aura", MilesDavis.com.

1989 albums
Miles Davis albums
Columbia Records albums
Grammy Award for Best Large Jazz Ensemble Album
Concept albums